Qiu Sen (born 26 January 1982) is a Chinese freestyle skier. He competed at the 2002 Winter Olympics and the 2006 Winter Olympics.

References

1982 births
Living people
Chinese male freestyle skiers
Olympic freestyle skiers of China
Freestyle skiers at the 2002 Winter Olympics
Freestyle skiers at the 2006 Winter Olympics
Skiers from Jiangsu
Asian Games medalists in freestyle skiing
Freestyle skiers at the 2007 Asian Winter Games
Asian Games silver medalists for China
Medalists at the 2007 Asian Winter Games